Murray Olds is an Australian sports journalist and broadcaster.

He has been a reporter for radio stations, including 2UE, and has provided reports for events such as the Commonwealth Games (including the 2006 Games) and Olympics since the 1980s.

References

Australian sports broadcasters
Living people
Year of birth missing (living people)